Patrice Gagnon (born May 12, 1963) is a Canadian slalom canoer who competed from the mid-1980s to the early 1990s. He finished 21st in the K-1 event at the 1992 Summer Olympics in Barcelona. Gagnon was born in Lévis, Quebec.

References
Sports-Reference.com profile

1963 births
Canadian male canoeists
Canoeists at the 1992 Summer Olympics
French Quebecers
Living people
Olympic canoeists of Canada
People from Lévis, Quebec